Richmond Flowers may refer to:
Richmond Flowers Sr. (1918–2007), Alabama's Attorney General
Richmond Flowers Jr. (born 1947), American football player 
Richmond Flowers III (born 1978), American football wide receiver from the 2001 NFL Draft